Nyctocyrmata  crotalopis is a species of moth belonging to the family Tineidae.

This species is presently known only from South Africa.
It has a wingspan of 6mm.

References

Endemic moths of South Africa
Myrmecozelinae
Moths described in 1921